Andrea Beck (born October 25th, 1956) is a Canadian illustrator living in Unionville, who is well known for her best-selling Elliot Moose books and the spin-off Elliot Moose television show, which aired in Canada and the US for ten years. Beck's characters are loved for their sweetness and charm and her books generally model friendship and community.  Her recent publications include the Pierre Le Poof trilogy and the popular Goodnight, Canada. Beck was born in Montreal.

Selected works
 Goodnight, Canada, 2012, North Winds Press
 Pierre in the Air, 2011,  Orca Book Publishers
 Pierre's Friends, 2010, Orca Book Publishers
 Elliot's Fire Truck, 2010, Orca Book Publishers.
 Pierre Le Poof, Orca Book Publishers, 2009, Preschool-grade 3.
 Buttercup's Lovely Day, Orca Book Publishers, 2008, Preschool-grade 3.
 Elliot's Emergency, Kids Can Press, 1998. Preschool-grade 3.
 Elliot Bakes a Cake, Kids Can Press, 1999. Preschool-grade 3.
 Elliot's Shipwreck, Kids Can Press, 2000. Preschool-grade 3.
 Elliot's Bath, Kids Can Press, 2000. Preschool-grade 3.
 Elliot Digs for Treasure, Kids Can Press, 2001. Preschool-grade 3.
 Elliot Gets Stuck, Kids Can Press, 2002. Preschool-grade 3.
 Elliot's Noisy Night, Kids Can Press, 2002. Preschool-grade 3.
 Elliot's Great Big Lift-the-Flap Book, Kids Can Press, 2003. Preschool-kindergarten.
 The Waiting Dog. Illustration. Kids Can Press, 2003. Grades 3 up.
 Elliot's Christmas Surprise, Kids Can Press, 2003. Preschool-grade 3.

References

External links

 

Canadian children's writers
Writers from Ontario
Living people
1956 births
Writers from Montreal
Canadian illustrators